Founded in 1856, the Smith of Derby Group are clockmakers based in Derby, England. Smith of Derby has been in operation continuously under five generations of the Smith family.

History 

John Smith (21 December 1813 - 1886) became an apprentice to John Whitehurst in 1827. He went on to be the founder of a new clockmaking company in 1856, first establishing his business in premises at 27 Queen Street in Derby.

John Smith’s new company flourished during the industrial revolution. When he died in 1886, his two sons, Frank and John took over the running of the family business. Under Frank Smith, the company were responsible for building the huge turret clock for St Paul's Cathedral in 1893.

Frank Smith died in 1913, and the company was run by staff until his son Alan was old enough to take over the running of the business. Alan Smith was succeeded by Howard Smith, who in turn, was succeeded by Nicholas Smith.

During the 20th century, Smith and Sons expanded through the acquisition of a variety of businesses. Clockmakers William Potts & Sons, Leeds were established in 1833 and acquired by Smith of Derby in 1933; JB Joyce & Co of Whitchurch were responsible for many clocks internationally and were acquired by Smith of Derby in 1965; George & Francis Cope were established in 1845 as producers of chronometers for the Admiralty, and joined Smith of Derby in 1984. In 1985 they acquired B & H (Derby) Ltd and became the current Smith of Derby Group.

In 2013, the company acquired the historical Scottish clockmakers James Ritchie & Son but continue to operate the firm as a subsidiary.

Public clock installations in Europe 

 Memorial Clock, Willenhall, 1892
 Cathedral Clock at St Paul's Cathedral, London 1893
 Town Hall clock in Grampound, Cornwall 1894
Glossop Town Hall, located in Derbyshire
The Jubilee Clock Tower, located in Maidenhead 1897
 Magheralin Co, Down Church Of Ireland Clock 1901
 Trinity College Clock, Cambridge 1910
 Cathedral Quarter Hotel Clock in Derby
 Temple Court time feature at Minories Shopping Centre, Birmingham
 Grand Brasserie Clock at St Pancras station, London
 Hourglass Clock at Burghley House near Stamford
 Planisphere at Bluewater Shopping Centre, Kent
 Light Clock at Royal Derby Hospital, Derby
 Restoration of original medieval Salisbury Cathedral clock in Salisbury
 Restoration of the Blair Castle Clock Tower destroyed by fire in Blair Atholl, Perthshire
 Portsmouth Guildhall Bell Tower restoration, Portsmouth
 "H. Samuel" clock (1963) hanging outside Cardiff Market, High Street, Cardiff. 
 Pierhead Clock (1897) restored and reinstalled by Smith of Derby in 2011 as public art in St Mary Street, Cardiff
 The DNA Clock (2011), located in the foyer of Redcar Hospital

Public clock installations in Asia 

 Nagercoil Clock Tower, Nagercoil, India
 DNA Clock at King Faisal University, Dammam, Saudi Arabia
 Tower Clock at Sultan Qaboos Grand Mosque, Muscat, Oman
 16 operational clocks in Mecca/Makkah, Holy Haram, Saudi Arabia
 Town Clock at Dammam, Saudi Arabia
 Seif Palace, Kuwait City, Kuwait
 Al-Mustansiriya University, Baghdad, Iraq
 Beach Rotana Hotel, Abu Dhabi, United Arab Emirates
 Central Bank of Oman, Muscat, Oman
 Souq Square, Nizwa, Oman
 Duthie's Clock Tower, Nagercoil
Ismaili Centre (JamatKhana), Hyderabad, Pakistan

Record-holding clocks 

 Guinness World Records: The world's largest pendulum-regulated clock is the Harmony Tower in Ganzhou, China.
 Guinness World Records: The world's largest steam clock is on the North Quay at St Helier, Jersey.
 The world's largest solar-powered clock is called 'The Beacon' and is installed as a feature clock at the University of Baghdad.
 The world's largest inclined clock is at Time Square in Al-Ain, UAE.
 The world's highest building mounted clock above street level is 170 metres above street level and is mounted on top of Boeing's Headquarters in Chicago.
 The world's largest mechanical tower clock is also the Harmony Tower in Ganzhou, China.
 The world's most remote public clock is owned by the Queen of Tonga.

In addition to these clock installations, Smith of Derby also manufactures some of the world's most expensive Islamic Prayer Clocks. The Prayer Clocks are customisable and can be designed to include precious metals and gems.

Other notable projects 

 Foucault Pendulum in the Donnan and Robinson Laboratory at Liverpool University
 Rotating steel globe on the Coliseum Theatre, London 
 One Revolution Per Day pendulum sculpture in Davos, Switzerland
 Eleanor Cross in Stamford, Lincolnshire
 Zoetrope in Billinghay, Lincolnshire 
 Clock mechanism in Herne Bay Clock Tower replaced by the company with synchronous electric hour striking unit in 1971.

Further reading

References

External links 
 The British Horological Institute
 Smith of Derby Group
 A Portrait of John Whitehurst

Clock manufacturing companies of the United Kingdom
Clocks in the United Kingdom
Companies based in Derby
Manufacturing companies of England
Design companies established in 1856
Manufacturing companies established in 1856
1856 establishments in England
Turret clock makers of the United Kingdom